Murder Bay was a disreputable slum in Washington D.C. roughly bounded by Constitution Avenue NW, Pennsylvania Avenue NW, and 15th Street NW. The area was a center of crime through the early 20th century, with an extensive criminal underclass and prostitution occurring in several brothels and hotels in the area. The area was completely rebuilt during the construction of the Federal Triangle project in the late 1920s and 1930s.

History
In the 1860s, much of the area south of Pennsylvania Avenue and a few blocks east of the White House had become a disreputable slum known as Murder Bay, the home to an extensive criminal underclass and numerous brothels. During the American Civil War, so many prostitutes took up residence in Murder Bay to serve the needs of General Joseph Hooker's Army of the Potomac that the area became known as "Hooker's Division." The two trapezoidal blocks sandwiched between Pennsylvania and Missouri Avenues (now the site of the National Gallery of Art) became home to such expensive brothels that it gained the nickname "Marble Alley." In the 1870s and 1880s, the avenue was the site of significant competition between horse-drawn streetcar and chariot companies.

A large house known as Bull's Head existed at the rear of the hotel that is now Old Ebbitt Grill. The house marked the northwest corner of "Murder Bay". Bull's Head housed prostitutes and contained a large, lower-class gambling den.

Demolition and redevelopment

Federal Triangle
In the mid-1910s, the federal government acquired land on Pennsylvania Avenue between 14th and 15th Streets and several blocks south, but no demolition or construction was conducted. In the 1920s the government began planning for new development in the Murder Bay area, which would eventually be called Federal Triangle. This became a major construction project for 10 large city and federal office buildings, and consequently the entire Murder Bay area was replaced with government and other commercial buildings.

A contract was issued in 1926 for razing several buildings along Constitution Avenue which would become the site for the new Internal Revenue Service Building. Congress began to appropriate funds for additional land acquisition in 1927, and the land purchases took several years to complete. Construction of additional buildings began in the late 1920s, with completion nearly complete by 1931. The Department of Commerce Building opened in 1932, and the Department of Justice, Department of Labor, Interstate Commerce Commission and National Archives buildings opened in 1935.

Pennsylvania Avenue National Historic Site
On March 25, 1965, President Lyndon Johnson issued Executive Order No. 11210, which established the Temporary Commission on Pennsylvania Avenue. The Pennsylvania Avenue National Historic Site was established on September 30, 1965, and various culturally, aesthetically, and historically significant structures and places were given historic status protection.

External links
 "Washington's Rough-and-Tumble Lost Neighborhood of Murder Bay" - Ghosts of DC

References

Geography of Washington, D.C.
Neighborhoods in Northwest (Washington, D.C.)
Historical red-light districts in the United States
Poverty in the United States
Federal Triangle